Assara is a genus of small moths belonging to the snout moth family (Pyralidae). They are part of the tribe Phycitini within the huge snout moth subfamily Phycitinae.

Selected species
Species of Assara include:

 Assara albicostalis
 Assara aterpes
 Assara balanophorae
 Assara cataxutha
 Assara chionopleura
 Assara conicolella
 Assara decipula Clarke, 1986
 Assara exiguella
 Assara formosana
 Assara funerella
 Assara halmophila (Meyrick, 1929)
 Assara holophragma
 Assara hoeneella
 Assara holophragma
 Assara incredibilis
 Assara inouei
 Assara ketjila Roesler & Küppers, 1981
 Assara korbi  (Caradja, 1910) (from China)
 Assara leucarma
 Assara linjiangensis
 Assara melanomita
 Assara microdoxa
 Assara murasei
 Assara odontosema
 Assara pallidella
 Assara pinivora
 Assara proleuca
 Assara quadriguttella
 Assara semifictile
 Assara seminivale (from Australia)
 Assara subarcuella
 Assara terebrella (Zincken, 1818) (from China)
 Assara tuberculosa
 Assara tumidula
 Assara turciella

Footnotes

References

  (1986): Pyralidae and Microlepidoptera of the Marquesas Archipelago. Smithsonian Contributions to Zoology 416: 1-485. PDF fulltext (214 MB!)
  (2004): Butterflies and Moths of the World, Generic Names and their Type-species – Assara. Version of 5 November 2004. Retrieved 28 May 2011.
  (2009): Markku Savela's Lepidoptera and Some Other Life Forms – Assara. Version of 9 April 2009. Retrieved 28 May 2011.

Phycitini
Moth genera